The Water Garden is a 1909 painting by Childe Hassam. Done in oil on canvas, the painting is on display at the Metropolitan Museum of Art, in New York.

Description
The painting depicts a vivacious patch of flowers set on a flat field of grass. This seemingly flat plain is pockmarked with shallow ponds that have been grown-over with aquatic plants. The painting has been noted for being heavily inflected on by post-impressionist artistic thought. According to the Metropolitan Museum of Art's description of the painting, Hassam's work was likely painted in East Hampton, where the artist spent his final years.

References

Paintings in the collection of the Metropolitan Museum of Art
Paintings by Childe Hassam
1909 paintings